Mons. Róbert Bezák, C.SS.R. (born 1 March 1960) is a Slovak Roman Catholic prelate. He was consecrated as Archbishop of Trnava on June 6, 2009, by Cardinal Jozef Tomko.

He was removed from his see on July 2, 2012. Hundreds of Catholics protested at Trnava Cathedral following the decision. Bezák told his congregation that the Holy See had made "serious allegations" against him and barred him from speaking to the media.

In December 2013 Bezák moved to the Redemptorist monastery in the Italian town of Bussolengo near Verona, in Italy.

References

External links
Bezák biography 
Bezák biography (in Slovak) 

1960 births
Living people
People from Handlová
Redemptorist bishops
21st-century Roman Catholic archbishops in Slovakia